= Sydney Tigers =

Sydney Tigers may refer to:

- Balmain Tigers, a National Rugby League team known as the Sydney Tigers during the 1995 and 1996 seasons
- APIA Leichhardt Tigers, an Association football club currently in the New South Wales Premier League known as the Sydney Tigers starting in the 2009 season
